Glen is a masculine given name. Notable people with the name include:

Glen Benton, American bass/vocals for Deicide, a death metal band
Glen Berger, American scriptwriter
Glen Campbell (1936–2017), American singer-songwriter and actor
Glen Cook, American science fiction and fantasy author
Glen Christian, American football player
Glen Davis (basketball) (born 1986), American basketball player
Glen Drover, Canadian guitarist
Glen Gauntt, American football player
Glen Hansard, Irish songwriter and vocalist/guitarist for Irish rock group The Frames
Glen Kamara (born 1995), Finnish footballer
Glen Miller (basketball coach) (born 1963), head men's basketball coach at the University of Pennsylvania
Glen Rice Jr., American basketball player who also played internationally
Glen Saville, former Australian basketball player
Glen Walker, American football player
Glen Walshaw, Zimbabwean freestyle swimmer
Glen Upton, Canadian actor

See also
Glen (disambiguation)
Glen (surname)
Glenn (name)

Masculine given names
English masculine given names